Llanymynech and Pant is a civil parish in Shropshire, England.  It contains 23 listed buildings that are recorded in the National Heritage List for England.  All the listed buildings are designated at Grade II, the lowest of the three grades, which is applied to "buildings of national importance and special interest".  The parish contains the villages of Llanymynech and Pant, and the surrounding area.  The border between England and Wales passes through Llanymynech, and this is marked by a boundary stone which is listed.  The area was once important for the manufacture of lime, and seven groups of lime kilns are listed, together with the much larger Hoffmann Kiln and its chimney.  In Llanymynech is a listed pair of houses, a public house, and a church together with a pair of gate piers, and a memorial in the churchyard.  Elsewhere, the listed buildings include farmhouses, farm buildings, an ice house, a gin wheel, a former mill, and a canal bridge.


Buildings

References

Citations

Sources

Lists of buildings and structures in Shropshire